Angus Shaw (born February 1949 in Salisbury, now Harare) is a Zimbabwean journalist, and novelist.

Life
Born in 1949, Shaw was orphaned in 1958, and sent to England for school.
He joined the Rhodesia Herald in 1972.
In 1975, he was conscripted into the Rhodesian Security Forces, but deserted to report on nationalist exiles in Lusaka and Dar es Salaam.
He worked for the state-controlled Sunday Mail newspaper.
He reported on Idi Amin's Ugandan death camps, and Somalia.
In February 2005, he was jailed for reporting on Robert Mugabe during the decline of Zimbabwe.
He reports for the Associated Press.

Works

References

External links
"Angus Shaw", ''Zimbabwe Journalists
"Angus Shaw", News Cred
"Angus Shaw", Newsvine
"Angus Shaw", Associated Press
"Angus Shaw", Literary Encyclopedia

Zimbabwean people of British descent
Zimbabwean journalists
Rhodesian military personnel of the Bush War
1949 births
People from Harare
Living people
21st-century Zimbabwean writers
20th-century Zimbabwean writers